Joanna Burt is a Canadian half-First Nations operatic soprano from Lindsay, Ontario. She is of Saugeen Ojibway and Métis descent fluent in English, Cree, and Ojibwe.

Burt performed at the Canadian Opera Company's 2017 production of Harry Sommer's opera Louis Riel in the role of Sara Riel, Louis Riel's sister.  She is the first singer of half-indigenous descent in a principal role with the Canadian Opera Company.

Burt is actively involved in Indigenous cultural outreach through work with the Métis Nation of Ontario.

References

Canadian operatic sopranos
Musicians from Ontario
Living people
First Nations musicians
Métis musicians
21st-century Canadian women opera singers
People from Kawartha Lakes
Year of birth missing (living people)